Narcissus jacetanus is a species of the genus Narcissus (daffodils) in the family Amaryllidaceae. It is classified in Section Pseudonarcissus. It is native to northern Spain around Pamplona. It is found on calcareous soil.

Taxonomy 
Amongst the Pseudonarcissus, it is classed as Group A, small flowered, in the Pacific Bulb Society modification of Mathew's taxonomy.

References

Bibliography 

Narcissus jacetanus  The Plant List
Narcissus jacetanus  World Checklist
Narcissus jacetanus Alpine Garden Society

jacetanus
Garden plants
Flora of Spain
Plants described in 1984